Julia Mailén Gomes Fantasia (born 30 April 1992) is an Argentine field hockey player.

Career
At the 2013 Pan American Cup she won her first gold medal with the Argentina national team in an international tournament. Julia also won two Champions Trophy and the World League 2014–15. She was part of the Argentine team at the 2016 Summer Olympics in Rio de Janeiro.

References

External links
 
 
 
 

1992 births
Living people
Las Leonas players
Argentine female field hockey players
Olympic field hockey players of Argentina
Argentine people of Portuguese descent
People from Puerto Madryn
Field hockey players at the 2015 Pan American Games
Pan American Games silver medalists for Argentina
Field hockey players at the 2016 Summer Olympics
Pan American Games medalists in field hockey
South American Games gold medalists for Argentina
South American Games medalists in field hockey
Female field hockey defenders
Competitors at the 2014 South American Games
Medalists at the 2015 Pan American Games